The Tilburg–Nijmegen railway is an important railway line in the Netherlands running from Tilburg to Nijmegen, passing through 's-Hertogenbosch. The line was opened in 1881.

Stations
The main interchange stations on the Tilburg–Nijmegen railway are:

Tilburg: to Breda and Eindhoven
's-Hertogenbosch: to Utrecht and Eindhoven
Nijmegen: to Arnhem and Venlo

It has been proposed that the Berkel-Enschot railway station should be reconstructed, adding a station between 's-Hertogenbosch and Tilburg.

References

Railway lines in the Netherlands
Railway lines in North Brabant
Transport in 's-Hertogenbosch
Transport in Oss
Transport in Tilburg
Nijmegen